Robert Bruce Meyer (born 13 October 1943, St. Louis) is an American physicist and professor at Brandeis University.

Meyer graduated from Harvard University in 1965 with a bachelor's degree and in 1970 with a doctoral degree with advisor  David Turnbull and dissertation on effects of electromagnetic fields on the structure of liquid crystals. At Harvard, Meyer was a postdoctoral student and became in 1971 an assistant professor and in 1974 an associate professor. At Brandeis University he was appointed an associate professor in 1978 and a full professor in 1985.

He was a visiting professor in 1977 of Nordita at Chalmers University in Gothenburg and in 1978 Joliot Curie Professor at the École Supérieure de Physique et de Chimie Industrielle in Paris.

In 2006 Meyer received, jointly with Noel A. Clark, the Oliver E. Buckley Condensed Matter Prize for basic theoretical and experimental studies of liquid crystals, in particular their ferroelectric and chiral properties (laudation). He was elected in 1985 a Fellow of the American Physical Society and received the 2004 Benjamin Franklin Medal of the Franklin Institute.

References

1943 births
Living people
20th-century American physicists
21st-century American physicists
Harvard University alumni
Brandeis University faculty
Fellows of the American Physical Society
Oliver E. Buckley Condensed Matter Prize winners
Scientists from St. Louis
Physicists from Missouri